is a Japanese actress. She won the award for best supporting actress at the 14th Hochi Film Award for Shaso.

Filmography
 Neo Tokyo (1989)
 Shaso (1989)
 The Pillow Book (1996)
 Will to Live (1999)
 By Player (2000)
 Cutie Honey (2004)
 Heaven's Bookstore (2004)
 Southbound (2007)

References

1944 births
Living people
Japanese actresses
Actors from Ishikawa Prefecture
People from Kanazawa, Ishikawa